Alfred Hume (1866–1950) was the Chancellor of the University of Mississippi from 1924 to 1930, and from 1932 to 1935.

Biography
He was born in Tennessee in 1866. He received a PhD from Vanderbilt University. He taught mathematics and astronomy at the University of Mississippi, until he served as its Chancellor from 1924 to 1930. Hume then taught mathematics at Rhodes College (then known as Southwestern) before returning to the University of Mississippi in 1932, where he remained until 1935. He prevented Governor Theodore G. Bilbo from moving Ole Miss to Jackson, Mississippi.

He was a member of Beta Theta Pi.

Bibliography

Secondary sources
Dr. Alfred Hume: his leadership as vice chancellor, acting chancellor, and chancellor of the University of Mississippi (1905-1945), Frances Egger Watson, Oxford, Mississippi: University of Mississippi Press, 1987

References

1866 births
1950 deaths
People from Tennessee
People from Mississippi
Vanderbilt University alumni
University of Mississippi people